Princess Anne Glacier is a glacier in the Queen Elizabeth Range, flowing from the area south of Mount Bonaparte between Cotton and Bartrum Plateaus into Marsh Glacier. Named by the northern party of the New Zealand Geological Survey Antarctic Expedition (NZGSAE) (1961–62) for Anne, Princess Royal, daughter of Elizabeth II of the United Kingdom.

Glaciers of Oates Land